Survivor South Africa: Maldives is the fourth season of the South African reality television show Survivor South Africa. It premiered on February 24, 2011, and concluded with a live finale on May 26, 2011. The season was filmed in the Addu Atoll of the island nation of the Maldives, and was the second season to be hosted by Nico Panagio.

The season featured 19 contestants competing in the Addu Atoll of the island nation of the Maldives over 27 days for a prize of one million rand and the title of Ultimate Survivor. Ten contestants were ordinary South Africans picked out of obscurity from open auditions ("Plebs") while nine were South African celebrities ("Celebs").

The season concluded when 32-year-old Celeb Hykie Berg was named the Ultimate Survivor over 27-year-old Pleb Letshego Moshoeu by an 8–3 jury vote.

Contestants

The cast was composed of 10 regular South Africans ("Plebs") and 9 celebrities ("Celebs"). Initially separated on 2 different islands based on their status, each group was unaware of the other group's presence. Both groups were separated into two teams (simply referred to as "Blue" and "Yellow") that would later be their official tribes. After the Blue Plebs faced a Tribal Council, the 18 remaining players formed the Goma tribe (composed of both Blue teams) and Raituhn tribe (composed of both Yellow teams) on Day 4. After a double tribal council on Day 15, the two tribes merged on Day 16 to form the tribe, Eku.

The final 12 players remaining made up the two finalists and the ten members of the Tribal Council Jury, who - along with the South African public as the 11th Juror - ultimately decided who would be the "Ultimate Survivor".

Notes

Future appearances
Tejan Pillay competed again in Survivor South Africa: Return of the Outcasts in 2022.

Season summary

Nineteen castaways, consisting of 10 regular South Africans ("Plebs") and 9 celebrities ("Celebs"), arrived in the Maldives. Initially separated on 2 different islands based on their status, each group was unaware of the other group's presence. Both groups were separated into two teams (simply referred to as "Blue" and "Yellow") that would later be the official tribes. After the Blue Plebs faced a Tribal Council, the 18 remaining players formed the Goma tribe (composed of both Blue teams) and Raituhn tribe (composed of both Yellow teams). Each tribe then assigned the weakest player in their tribes with a Black Cowrie shell, which added a vote against them at each Tribal Council before the merge. After the unification, Raituhn initially were down in numbers due to a clear divide where the "Plebs" kept betraying the outnumbered "Celebs". However, a series of events in Goma that saw a tribe member quitting, a majority alliance blindsided by an idol, and a medical evacuation, led to an unsteady Raituhn alliance entering the merge with a 5-4 majority.

The merge saw the introduction of a White Cowrie shell in Bonnie's possession; this shell nullified a single vote at a Tribal Council. While the Raituhn alliance initially voted out Goma's leader, Simon, the "Celebs" Bonnie and Hykie used the White Cowrie and a hidden immunity idol to betray their alliance with the Raituhn "Plebs" until only Letshego remained. Before the remaining Goma "Plebs", Alison and Sean, could convince Letshego to flip on the "Celeb" duo, she found a hidden immunity idol and stuck with the powerful duo of Bonnie and Hykie to pick off the remaining Goma alliance. Despite a surprising final immunity challenge win by Letshego, who sent Bonnie to the jury to finally break up the strategic "Celeb" duo, the jury criticized both her and Hykie's poor social games, but felt that Hykie's cutthroat strategic game alongside Bonnie was more deserving than Letshego's under-the-radar game. Along with South Africa deciding in a public poll to award him with a jury vote, the jury awarded Hykie the title of Ultimate Survivor in an 8–3 victory over Letshego.

In the case of multiple tribes or castaways who win reward or immunity, they are listed in order of finish, or alphabetically where it was a team effort; where one castaway won and invited others, the invitees are in brackets.

Episodes

Voting history

References

External links
Official Website

Survivor South Africa seasons
2011 South African television seasons
2011 in the Maldives
Television shows filmed in the Maldives